Laundry Service is the fifth studio album and first English-language album by Colombian singer Shakira, globally released on 13 November 2001 by Epic Records. After her fourth studio album Dónde Están los Ladrones? became a success in Latin America, Spain, Middle East and the Latin community in the United States, Shakira was encouraged by American singer Gloria Estefan to record songs in English as she believed her friend had the potential to crossover into the English-language pop market. Shakira was hesitant at first, but then decided to learn English well enough to write songs in the language. The title of the album reflects Shakira's views on love and music. It was released as Servicio de Lavandería in Hispanic regions in January 2002. Laundry Service is primarily a pop rock record but it also experiments with Andean music, dance-pop, Middle Eastern music, rock and roll and tango music. The album's theme is love and romance. Every song on it was written and produced by Shakira under the guidance of Emilio Estefan.

Six singles were released from the album. The lead single "Whenever, Wherever" became an international success, reaching number one on record charts of Australia, Austria, Canada, France, Germany, Italy and Spain. The second English-language single "Underneath Your Clothes" repeated that success, topping the charts of Australia, Austria, and Belgium. Both singles charted in the top ten in the United Kingdom and United States. Spanish-language singles "Te Dejo Madrid" and "Que Me Quedes Tú" performed well in Hispanic regions, becoming hits in Spain and on the Latin record charts in the United States, respectively. The fourth single "Objection (Tango)" became a top ten hit in most countries around the world, while the sixth and final single "The One" was a moderate commercial success. To promote the album, Shakira embarked on her Tour of the Mongoose between 2002 and 2003. It was her first major worldwide tour and visited many countries and cities.

Laundry Service received favourable to mixed reviews from music critics. Many critics complimented Shakira's varied musical styles and originality, while some critics argued that the album sounded too generic. Shakira's vocal talent also attracted praise. Laundry Service topped the charts of Australia, Austria, Belgium, Canada and Switzerland, while reaching the top five in Argentina, France, Germany, Spain and the United Kingdom. In the United States, Laundry Service peaked at number three on the Billboard 200 chart. The album received multiple record certifications, including sextuple platinum in Australia, quintuple in Canada, Spain and Switzerland. It was also certified multi-platinum in the United Kingdom and the United States, proving to be a successful crossover for Shakira. Globally, Laundry Service was the seventh best-selling album in 2002. The album sold around 13 million copies by 2011, making it one of the best-selling albums of the 21st century.

The album is listed at number 172 of the "Definitive 200" by the Rock and Roll Hall of Fame.

Background
In 1998, Shakira released her second major label studio album Dónde Están los Ladrones? (Where Are the Thieves?), which became a success in Latin America and received record certifications in various countries like Argentina, Colombia, Chile, Mexico and Spain. The rock en español-influenced Latin pop album drew comparisons to the work of Canadian-American singer songwriter Alanis Morissette and "cracked the lucrative US market wide open", spending a total of 11 weeks atop the Billboard Top Latin Albums chart. It became Shakira's first album to receive a platinum certification from the Recording Industry Association of America (RIAA). Dónde Están los Ladrones? spawned the Arabian-styled single "Ojos Así" ("Eyes Like Yours"), which became a hit and was deemed the "signature track" of the album.

Shakira's record label at that time, Epic Records, opposed the decision to release and commission Laundry Service as they "wanted her just to throw a couple of songs in English on a Latin record." Gloria Estefan argued with Tommy Mottola, then head of Sony Music Entertainment (the parent company of Epic Records), and convinced him to release the album, arguing that an "American audience" would not buy a Spanish record simply due to its inclusion of a few English tracks. In an interview with Latina, she said "I got in the trenches there with Tommy [Mottola] - I fought for that. Because they didn't believe it. Just like they told us [her and Emilio during the Miami Sound Machine days]. They were trying to think in the box and I wanted to take her out of the box. And fortunately, Tommy, whom I love and adore and is a good friend, he really listened to me."

Writing and recording

The success of Dónde Están los Ladrones? prompted American singer Gloria Estefan in 1999, whose husband Emilio Estefan was managing Shakira at that time, to persuade Shakira to attempt to crossover into the mainstream pop industry. However, Shakira was initially hesitant to record songs in English as it was not her first language, so Estefan offered to translate "Ojos Así" into English in order to show her that "it could translate well." Shakira then began translating the song herself and showed it to Estefan, who responded "Quite honestly, I can't do this better!." As Shakira wanted to have full control over her recordings, she decided to learn English better to enable her to write her own songs. Wanting to find a method to express her "day-to-day stories in English", Shakira bought rhyming dictionaries, started analysing the lyrics of songs by Bob Dylan, reading poetry and the work of authors like Leonard Cohen and Walt Whitman and took English lessons from a private tutor.

The first song she wrote was "Objection (Tango)" and in an interview with Faze, she revealed that writing songs in English proved to be challenging for her: "I prayed and asked God to send me a good song today, and I remember I started writing the song ['Objection (Tango)'] a couple of hours after. I wrote the music and lyrics at the same time, and when that happens it's really magical to me." After completing "Objection (Tango)", Shakira decided to write ten more songs and began setting up portable recording studios in the rural region of Uruguay. She wrote various songs with a "dictionary in one hand and a thesaurus in the other."   During the songwriting process, Shakira wrote "Underneath Your Clothes" as a love song for de la Rúa. She explained that, "If you check the subject of my songs, most of them talk about my own experiences and feelings and what I was actually going through in my life." 
Shakira collaborated with various writers and producers on the album including Estefan, Lester Mendez, Luis Fernando Ochoa and Tim Mitchell. Being "more in control than ever", Shakira closely supervised the development of the album. The singer also served as the primary producer of the album.

Composition

Although primarily a pop rock album, Laundry Service also draws influences from a variety of musical genres. The singer credited this to her mixed ethnicity, saying "I am a fusion. That's my persona. I'm a fusion between black and white, between pop and rock, between cultures - between my Lebanese father and my mother's Spanish blood, the Colombian folklore and Arab dance I love and American music." Arabian and Middle Eastern elements, which had a high influence on Dónde Están los Ladrones?, are also present in Laundry Service, most prominently on "Eyes Like Yours" (Ojos Así). Musical styles from different South American countries surface on the album. Tango, a style of fast-paced ballroom dance that originated in Argentina, is evident on "Objection (Tango)", which also combines elements of rock and roll. The uptempo track features a guitar solo and a bridge in which Shakira delivers rap-like vocals. "Whenever, Wherever" blends pop rock with Andean music and contains instrumentation from panpipes and the charango - traditional instruments generally associated with the genre.

A few songs are also influenced by dance-based genres; the "feisty" "Rules" is laced with new wave and "Ready for the Good Times" is inspired by disco music. The power ballad "Underneath Your Clothes" has Shakira delivering "racked" vocals and features brass instrumentation influenced by English rock band The Beatles. It contains a melody similar to the one in "Eternal Flame", a 1989 song by American all-female band The Bangles. Similarly, the tune of "The One", another power ballad on the album, is similar to that of "Michelle", a 1965 song by The Beatles. "Fool" and "Poem to a Horse" are more directly influenced by rock music. The former received comparisons to the work of Alanis Morissette while the latter also displays indie elements and contains instrumentation from a soul music-styled horn section and guitar riffs similar to the one present in songs by American grunge band Nirvana. Laundry Service also contains four Spanish tracks: "Que Me Quedes Tú" ("That You Remain With Me"), "Te Dejo Madrid" ("I Leave You Madrid"), "Suerte" ("Luck") and "Te Aviso, Te Anuncio (Tango)" ("I'm Warning You, I'm Announcing to You"); the latter two are Spanish translations of "Whenever, Wherever" and "Objection (Tango)", respectively.

The lyrics of most songs in Laundry Service are based on issues and themes related to love, as they had been written after Shakira began a relationship Antonio de la Rúa, the son of former Argentine president Fernando de la Rúa. "Underneath Your Clothes" is an "ode" to the positivity one gains when pursuing a relationship with a good person. Shakira shows an "important side" in "The One", which is a song about how "you love your guy so much that you're actually going to learn to cook" and contains lines like "To buy more thongs and write more happy songs, it always takes a little help from someone." In "Rules", she aims to make her lover realise that he is "condemned" to her and lists "all the things your new boy can do." Songs like "Objection (Tango)" and "Fool" also deal with issues related to love but in a different manner. The former is dramatic and humorous in approach as Shakira commands her partner to end a love triangle and choose between her and the other lady; it was described as a "hell-hath-no-fury it's-her-or-me steam train." In the song, Shakira asserts that "Next to her cheap silicon I look minimal/That's why in front of your eyes I'm invisible", which a reviewer commented was a "brave statement in these days of suspiciously ripe teenybop flesh peddlers ." "Fool" discusses how Shakira continues to try to build up a relationship with a "shitty, self-absorbed man" even after suffering a "soul-crushing defeat."

Release
The album was globally released on 13 November 2001 in nations including Australia, France, Italy, Switzerland and the United States. In Latin American countries like Mexico, the album was released as Servicio de Lavandería in January 2002. In the United Kingdom, Laundry Service was released on 11 March 2002. On 12 November 2002, a limited edition version of the album entitled Laundry Service: Washed and Dried was released; this version of the album features three additional remixes and a bonus disc which contains multimedia content related to "Objection (Tango)".

Shakira chose to entitle the album Laundry Service as she wanted to represent her passion for love and music, which she compared to soap and water, saying "The reason I named it "Laundry Service" is because I've spent the year dedicated to my two great passions: love and music. Those two elements are like soap and water. It was a deep cleansing, almost like being reborn." The artwork of the album was also designed by Shakira and shows a close-up of the back of a blonde-haired Shakira; a star and the name of the album are seen tattooed on her arm.

Singles

"Whenever, Wherever" was released as the lead single from Laundry Service in early October 2001. The song was commercially successful, peaking at number one in countries including Australia, Austria, France, Germany Italy, and more than 14 countries worldwide. In the United States, "Whenever, Wherever" became Shakira's first single to chart on the Billboard Hot 100 chart and peaked at number six. It stood as the singer's highest peaking single on the chart until "Hips Don't Lie" reached number one in 2006. "Whenever, Wherever" narrowly missed peaking atop the chart in the United Kingdom by reaching number two. "Suerte", the Spanish-language version of the song, was also released and peaked at number one in Spain and on the US Billboard Hot Latin Songs chart. "Whenever, Wherever" attained numerous record certifications around the world, including multi-platinum certifications in Australia, Belgium, and Switzerland, platinum certifications in the United Kingdom, and a diamond certification in France. The accompanying music video of the song, which features Shakira belly dancing in various locations, was directed by Francis Lawrence and became popular on music video television channel MTV.

"Te Dejo Madrid" was released as the second single from the album in January 2002. It peaked at number seven in Spain but performed poorly on the Latin record charts in the United States, peaking at number 45 on the Billboard Hot Latin Songs chart. Spanish bullfighter Julián López Escobar, better known by his stage name El Juli, filed a lawsuit against Shakira for using scenes of one of his performances in the music video for "Te Dejo Madrid" without his permission.

"Underneath Your Clothes" was released as the third single from the album in February 2002. The song peaked atop the charts in Australia, Austria, and Belgium; it was certified platinum in the three countries. In other countries, it became a top five hit. "Underneath Your Clothes" entered the top ten of the US Billboard Hot 100 chart, peaking at number nine, while in the United Kingdom it reached number three. The accompanying music video for "Underneath Your Clothes" was directed by Herb Ritts and depicts Shakira's life on tour. Shakira's then boyfriend Antonio de la Rua makes an appearance in the video and this led to music retailer Tower Records Argentina banning sales of her albums in the country. The reason behind the ban was that Antonio de la Rua's father Fernando de la Rúa, who was the President of Argentina at that time, had resigned "in the midst of profound economic and political turmoil in the country," and the decision to ban sales of Shakira's albums was a "direct protest against Antonio De la Rua—not Shakira."

"Objection (Tango)" was released as the fourth single in May 2002. Although it was not a commercial success as big as "Whenever, Wherever" or "Underneath Your Clothes", the song performed well nonetheless. "Objection (Tango)" became a top ten hit in most countries and reached the top five in Australia and Netherlands. The song was certified platinum in Australia and gold in France. It became the last single from Laundry Service to chart on both the US Billboard Hot 100 and the UK Singles Chart, on which it peaked at numbers 55 and 17, respectively. Directed by Dave Meyers, the music video for "Objection (Tango)" features Shakira fighting her unfaithful lover and his mistress.

"Que Me Quedes Tú" was released as the fifth single in November 2002 and peaked at number 10 on the Spanish Singles Chart. It became a success on the Latin record charts in the United States, topping both the Billboard Hot Latin Songs and Latin Pop Airplay charts.

"The One" was released as the sixth and final single from the album in December 2002. It was a moderate chart success and reached the top 20 in most countries. "The One" became the only single from the album to not appear on any US Billboard chart. The music video for "The One" was directed by Esteban Sapir and Ramiro Agulla and shows Shakira singing the song while walking outside in the rain.

Tour

To promote Laundry Service, Shakira embarked on the Tour of the Mongoose from 2002 to 2003. The tour was the singer's first worldwide tour and visited 50 cities and 30 countries, with its kick-off concert show held in San Diego, California. Various brands and franchises co-sponsored the tour, including international clothing brand Reebok and soft drink brand Pepsi. Seven buses and ten trailers were also employed to transport all the staff members. A stage covering 350 square meters was set up and preparations to arrange 280,000 watts of sound and light were made. A "solid nine-piece band" was hired to provide live instrumentation. Regarding the title of the tour, Shakira explained her decision to name it after the mongoose, saying:
"It's called the Tour of the Mongoose, and the mongoose is basically one of the few animals who can defeat the most venomous snakes with just one bite. And that's why I decided to name my tour that way, because I think that if we all have a little mongoose inside that can defeat the hatred and the resentment and the prejudice of everyday, we can probably win the battle."
Likewise, the theme of the tour was highly influenced by Shakira's political views, and this was prominently seen during the performance of "Octavo Día", a song from Dónde Están los Ladrones?, during which a film showing puppet caricatures of George W. Bush, then-President of the United States, and Saddam Hussein, then-President of Iraq, playing chess with their moves being controlled by the Grim Reaper. During the opening of the concert shows, a "massive" stage curtain showing a "mongoose and a cobra preparing for battle" split and a giant cobra slowly began rising from the centre of the stage to reveal Shakira, who wore "black leather pants and a black bikini top" and performed barefoot. Shakira incorporated belly dancing moves in her performances and often played various instruments throughout the shows herself, including the harmonica. Eight songs from Laundry Service were included on the setlist of the tour. A more afro-punk oriented version of "Objection (Tango)" was performed and featured instrumentation from bongos. As an intro to "Rules", Shakira played the harmonica, guitar, and drums. She also played an electric guitar during the performance of "Fool". "Whenever, Wherever" was included in the encore segment of the shows and was "made to feel even more celebratory by the massive amount of confetti shot on the crowd midway through." Shakira also performed covers of "Dude Looks Like a Lady", a song by American hard rock band Aerosmith, and "Back in Black", a song by Australian hard rock band AC/DC. Many performances made use of pyrotechnics and "six-foot flames that shot from the stage."

In 2004, a live album of the tour was released as Live & Off the Record. Aside from recording of the performances, the album included an hour-long documentary that shows Shakira "touring the world and doing such fun things as blowing bubbles, getting massages, and being serenaded by a mariachi band." A promotional CD single featuring the live performances of "Poem to a Horse" and "Whenever, Wherever" was also released to promote Live & Off the Record. The live album was certified platinum in France and gold in the United States.

Critical reception

Critical reception towards Laundry Service ranged from favourable to mixed, with critics expressing different opinions regarding the production and composition of the album. Alex Henderson from AllMusic commended Shakira's songwriting abilities in English, calling it a "challenge that she handles impressively well. Shakira, it turns out, sings quite convincingly in English," and also praised her different mixes of musical styles, saying "Like Shakira's Spanish-language albums, this self-produced CD is enjoyably eclectic; she successfully combines pop/rock with everything from tango on "Objection (Tango)" and Andean music on "Whenever, Wherever" to Middle Eastern music on "Eyes Like Yours". He concluded that "Dónde Están los Ladrones? remains Shakira's most essential album, but Laundry Service is an excellent English-language debut for the South American vocalist." A critic from Billboard also favoured the presence of various musical styles on the album and commented that "Laundry Service finds the 24-year-old artist unafraid of merging musical flavors," and complimented Shakira's vocal talent. Similarly, the Entertainment.ie review of the album deemed the lyrical content "surreal" and the production "no less bizarre [...] imposing breakneck tangos, twanging guitar solos and bizarre raps onto a familiar soft rock template." They felt that Laundry Service could not be called a "great album", reasoning that "the line between fascinatingly strange and offputtingly weird is a thin one, and Laundry Service crosses it far too often," but also stated that "Even so, Shakira's star quality can hardly be denied - and in today's increasingly conformist pop industry that deserves at least two cheers."

Alexis Petridis from The Guardian lauded Shakira's originality, opining that "In an age of personality-free pop idols, Shakira's glorious eccentricity makes her a true star," and commented that "Every song contains at least one non sequitur so eccentric that it could be the work of 1970s rock surrealist Captain Beefheart" and "The music on Laundry Service gives the lyrics a run for their money in the oddball handicap." Although he felt that the use of samples on various songs "displays an attitude to plagiarism that Noel Gallagher would consider cavalier" and that "no one could claim Laundry Service was a groundbreaking work of art," he concluded that "its ramshackle production and imponderable lyrics are striking and unique. And these days, it's hard not to find any pop record that provokes those adjectives rather cheering." Music critic Robert Christgau termed Laundry Service "the Cher album Cher never made" and attributed this to Shakira's blend of Middle Eastern styles in her music; he commented that the "stylistic appetite of this Colombian superstar is pure rock en Español" and appreciated Shakira's confident songwriting. Christgau also noted Shakira's strong vibrato and constant changing of timbre in her vocals. Lisa Oliver from Yahoo! Music said that Shakira's experimentation with different styles yield "results ranging from corking to minging," but experienced difficulty with the formatting of the CD, saying "the biggest problem with 'Laundry Service' is the anti-copying device that renders the CD useless in anything other than a conventional CD player [...] A shame then, because this Latino hottie could dilate the musical pupils of even the most ardent homebody if only they could get off the computer long enough to hear it."

At the same time Shakira's album evoked sharp criticism by a number of authors. David Browne from Entertainment Weekly, for instance, called the album a "the ultimate in crossover nightmares" and opined that Shakira's incorporation of different musical genres made it sound confusing, saying "Its wan ska-pop, faux-country ballads, and generic rock barely betray a Spanish accent or any musical heritage. (She can't decide if she wants to sound like Alanis or Shania)". Matt Cibula from PopMatters gave a more mixed view in his review of Laundry Service; he complimented some of the lyrics of the songs but expressed disappointment in Shakira's production of the album, writing it off as "generic". He felt that the album was "extremely safe" and speculated that the reason behind the album's "generic" sound was due to the Estefans' involvement, saying "when I read that she's [Gloria Estefan] helping you with lyrics and he's [Emilio Estefan] 'executive producer', and I hear the unmistakable hum of 'moneymoneymoneymoney' in the background ." Ernesto Lechner from Rolling Stone complimented the singer's voice as a "wild and beautiful instrument [...] capable of delivering scorching moments of musical passion," but commented that the involvement of a "battalion of producers and songwriters" led to Shakira sounding "downright silly" on Laundry Service and also criticised "her efforts to spice things up with obvious touches of Latin American folklore."

Some authors criticised Shakira's first English album for the clumsy rhyme of its songs. Elizabeth Mendez Berry's article in "Vibe" is particularly indicative in this sense.  In reference to Shakira's texts in English, the journalist wrote: "While her Spanish-language albums sparkled with elegant wordplay, this record is rife with cliches, both musically and lyrically. [...] For Anglophone Latin lovers, Shakira's lyrics are best left to the imagination."

Accolades
Laundry Service garnered Shakira a number of awards. At the 2002 American Latino Media Arts Awards (ALMA Awards) ceremony, the album won the award for "Album of the Year" and Shakira won the award for "Outstanding Female Performer". At the inaugural MTV Video Music Awards Latin America (VMALA) ceremony in 2002, Shakira won a total of five awards, which included "Artist of the Year", "Video of the Year" (for "Suerte"), "Female Artist of the Year", "Pop Artist of the Year" and "Best Artist - North Latin America". At the inaugural Premios Oye! in the same year, the album received a nomination in the category of "Record of the Year", while Shakira won the awards for "International Female Artist of the Year" and "Latin Pop Female Artist of the Year". At the 2002 Premio Lo Nuestro ceremony, Shakira won the "Premio del Pueblo" ("People's Choice Award") in the category of "Pop/Rock" for Laundry Service. At the 2003 NRJ Music Awards, Laundry Service was announced as the winner of "Best International Album" and Shakira was named the "Best International Female Artist". The album was also nominated for "International Album of the Year" at the 2003 Juno Awards.

Commercial performance

In Austria, Laundry Service entered the Ö3 Austria Top 40 albums chart at number five and peaked at number one, spending a total of 71 weeks on the chart. The album was certified double-platinum by the IFPI Austria for selling 80,000 units. In the Dutch-speaking Flanders region of Belgium, it reached number one on the Ultratop chart, while it peaked at number five in the French-speaking Wallonia region of the country. After debuting at number 40 on the Finnish Albums Chart, Laundry Service quickly ascended to number one and charted for a total of 49 weeks. By 2007, the album had gone triple-platinum in the country and had sold a total of 90,140 units. In France, Laundry Service debuted at number nine on the Syndicat National de l'Édition Phonographique (SNEP) albums chart and peaked at number five for three weeks; its stay on the chart lasted for 89 weeks. It was certified double-platinum by the SNEP for sales of 600,000 units. It remained as Shakira's greatest certified album in the country until her ninth studio album Sale el Sol was certified diamond in 2011. In Germany, it peaked at number two on the Media Control chart and charted for 31 weeks. Bundesverband Musikindustrie (BVMI) certified Laundry Service quintuple-gold in Germany for shipments of 750,000 units. In Hungary, it peaked at number four on the MAHASZ chart and was her highest charting album in the country until Sale el Sol reached the same position in 2010. The album was certified platinum in Hungary.

After debuting at number three on the Italian Albums Chart, Laundry Service ascended to number two the following week but was kept from attaining the top position by Alanis Morissette's 2002 album Under Rug Swept. In Spain, Servicio de Lavanderia reached number two on the PROMUSICAE albums chart. It also charted in 2005 in the country along with Shakira's fifth and sixth studio albums Fijación Oral, Vol. 1 and Oral Fixation, Vol. 2, respectively. The album has been certified quintuple-platinum by PROMUSICAE for shipments of 500,000 units. In Sweden, Laundry Service debuted atop the Sverigetopplistan chart and stayed on the top position for three weeks. It was certified double platinum by IFPI Sweden in 2003. In Switzerland, the album entered the Schweizer Hitparade chart at number 81 and peaked at number one, spending a total of 84 weeks on the chart. Laundry Service was later certified quintuple-platinum by the IFPI for selling 200,000 units in Switzerland. In the United Kingdom, Laundry Service debuted at number three on the UK Albums Chart. It later peaked at number two. The album was certified double-platinum by the British Phonographic Industry (BPI) for shipments of 600,000 copies. By 2002, Laundry Service had sold more than four million copies in Europe alone and thus was certified quadruple-platinum by IFPI Europe. "Laundry Service" has become one of the best selling album of all time in Turkey and she has received a platinum disc by Sony Music Turkey in a press conference in Istanbul in 2002.

In Australia, Laundry Service became Shakira's first album to chart on the ARIA Albums Chart after debuting at number two. It later peaked at number one for two weeks and in total it spent 54 weeks on the charts. Consequently, it became the second best-selling album of the year 2002 in the country, behind only American rapper Eminem's album The Eminem Show. The Australian Recording Industry Association (ARIA) certified Laundry Service quintuple-platinum for shipments of 350,000 units, making it Shakira's most successful album in the country and one of the best selling albums of all time in Australia, entering the all time chart at position of 29. The album also performed well in New Zealand, peaking at number four on the national albums chart and appearing on the chart for 47 weeks. By 2003, Laundry Service had been certified triple-platinum by the Recording Industry Association of New Zealand (RIANZ) for shipping 45,000 units.

In Canada, the album peaked atop the Billboard Canadian Albums Chart and is Shakira's only album to reach number one in the country. Eventually, Laundry Service was certified quintuple-platinum by Music Canada for shipments of 500,000 albums. In the United States, Laundry Service debuted and peaked at number three on the Billboard 200 chart, selling 200,000 copies in its first week. It stayed on the chart for a total of 61 weeks. The album also debuted and peaked at number six on the Billboard Top Internet Albums chart. It has sold over 1 million copies less than a month after its release. After around six months since its release, Laundry Service had been certified triple-platinum by the RIAA for shipments of 3,000,000 units in the United States. It is Shakira's best-selling album in the country, with sales of 3,526,000 units as of March 2014. According to Sony Music Canada, the album has been certified 4× Platinum in the United States. The album in its first year of release managed to sell 10 million copies worldwide making Shakira an award given by Sony Music for the highest recorded sales. According to the IFPI, Laundry Service was the seventh best-selling album in the world in 2002 with platinum certifications in 32 countries and gold certification in 10 countries. The album was named as one of the 100 biggest albums of the century by female artists in the United Kingdom by Official Charts, ranking at number 81.

Impact and legacy

The album's commercial success led to Shakira being deemed one of the most successful Latin crossover artists of all time, with Steve Huey from AllMusic calling her "Latin pop's biggest female crossover artist since Jennifer Lopez" and "an instant pop sensation, thanks to her quirky poetic sense and a sexy video image built on her hip-shaking belly dance moves." The success of the album also received considerable backlash, with many calling Shakira a "sellout". This negative response was further heightened by the fact that Shakira, a natural brunette, had bleached her hair blonde prior to the album's release, which many viewed as a tactic to "fit into the US market." Regarding this backlash, Shakira said, "I know my Latin people find this difficult. And I want [my success] to be good news to my country. But it's typical that when you see somebody who is so close to you growing, you feel that the very word 'growing' is synonymous with leaving. My hair is a coincidence. I dyed it more than two and a half years ago." On the other hand, many viewed Shakira's crossover success as a "strong cultural statement" as her musical style represented her mixed ethnicity.

In 2002, the singer was interviewed by Nobel Literature Prize-winning Colombian novelist and journalist Gabriel García Márquez, who was "astonished by her fantastical work-rate" and said that "Shakira's music has a personal stamp that doesn't look like anyone else's and no one can sing or dance like her, at whatever age, with such an innocent sensuality, one that seems to be of her own invention." In the United States and the United Kingdom, Shakira drew comparisons to American pop singer Britney Spears as they looked similar and sported "bleached blonde curls and butter-wouldn't-melt smiles for the kids down the front." However, critics argued that Shakira's vocal style was very different from Spears', with Ted Kessler from The Observer calling the former an "operatic diva" and writing that "as soon as she opens her mouth, she slips into gear and motors powerfully past Britney's breathy bump'n'grind." In 2009, Julia Llewellyn Smith from The Daily Telegraph commented that "Shakira makes comparable Spanish-English 'crossover' acts such as Jennifer Lopez and Enrique Iglesias seem like minnows." In an interview with Latina magazine in 2011, Gloria Estefan was asked whether she felt another crossover artist like Shakira could emerge in her lifetime, to which she responded, "I'm always hopeful that somebody, any Latino, is going to succeed in what they do. And of course in music, undoubtedly." Shakira's crossover success has been such that the media point out that possibly without its crossover many Latin artists such as Karol G, Becky G, Bad Bunny, Maluma or J Balvin would possibly not have the recognition that they enjoy today, and it is seen as a great step in the Latin industry since with the voice of Shakira the music industry would stop only focusing on American artists and Latinas would enter the arena such as Paulina Rubio, Thalía and even Fey who also ventured to conquer other audiences. Noting that thanks to Shakira, Latino artists now have a greater space in an international music industry in which prejudice and even racism continue to exist.

Shakira's belly-dancing ability came into attention and gathered coverage during this period, especially due to the music video of the lead single "Whenever, Wherever". The song also became famous for one of its lines in which Shakira sings "Lucky that my breasts are small and humble, so you don't confuse them with mountains"; it is often cited as an example of the unusual lyrical content of the singer's songs. According to Steve Huey from AllMusic, many critics were "divided as to the effectiveness of Shakira's English lyrics, but nearly all agreed on her unique poetic imagery." Huey further commented that the song and its video turned Shakira into a "star in the English-speaking world almost overnight." "Whenever, Wherever", along with "Underneath Your Clothes", is considered to be one of Shakira's signature songs.

Track listing
Credits are adapted from the liner notes of Laundry Service.

Notes
 signifies a co-producer
 translated the song into English from the original Spanish-language version "Ojos Así"
 remixed by Hani Kamai

Personnel
Credits adapted from AllMusic.

 Shakira – producer, songwriter, arranger, vocals, harmonica, logo design
 Emilio Estefan Jr. – executive producer, percussion
 Terry Manning – engineer
 Javier Garza – producer, engineer, mixer, arranger
 Tim Mitchell – producer, arranger, guitar, mandolin, programmer
 Lester Mendez – producer, arranger, horn arranger, keyboards
 Pablo Flores – producer, arranger, programmer
 Ted Jensen - Mastering 
 Luis Fernando Ochoa – arranger, guitar, keyboards
 Jorge Calandrelli – arranger, piano arranger
 David Campbell – conductor, string arranger
 Alfred Figueroa – engineer
 Kevin Dillon – production coordinator
 Steven Menezes – studio coordinator
Adam Zimmon – guitar
 Tim Pierce – guitar
 Brian Ray – guitar
 Paul Bushnell – bass guitar
 Julio Hernandez – bass guitar
 Pablo Aslan – acoustic bass
 Brendan Buckley – drums, percussion
 Abe Laboriel, Jr. – drums
 Edwin Bonilla – percussion
 Richard Bravo – percussion
 Archie Pena – percussion
 David Alsina - bandoneon

Charts

Weekly charts

Year-end charts

Decade-end charts

All-time charts

Certifications and sales

See also
List of best-selling albums by women
List of best-selling albums of the 21st century
List of best-selling albums of the 2000s in Australia
List of best-selling albums in France
List of 200 Definitive Albums in the Rock and Roll Hall of Fame

References

2001 albums
Shakira albums
Epic Records albums
Albums produced by Emilio Estefan